Zaozeritsa is a rural locality (a village) in Ust-Alexeyevskoye Rural Settlement, Velikoustyugsky District, Vologda Oblast, Russia. The population was 41 as of 2002.

Geography 
Zaozeritsa is located 62 km southeast of Veliky Ustyug (the district's administrative centre) by road. Bolshoy Dvor is the nearest rural locality.

References 

Rural localities in Velikoustyugsky District